Emmanuel Iyamulemye Niyibigira,  commonly known as Emmanuel Iyamulemye, is a Ugandan agricultural scientist, businessman and corporate executive, who is the incumbent managing director of the Uganda Coffee Development Authority (UCDA). On 17 November 2021, the UCDA board of directors appointed him to a second five-year term in his present position.

Background and education
Iyamulemye is a Ugandan by birth. He holds an undergraduate degree in agricultural science, from an undisclosed university. His master's degree in Crop Science was awarded by Wageningen University, in the Netherlands. He went on to obtain a Doctor of Philosophy degree in Agricultural Science from the same university. His degree of Master of Business Administration was awarded by Uganda Martyrs University.

Career
As of November 2021, Iyamulemye's career and work experience stretched back in excess of 15 years. For a period of 2 years, after graduate school, he was the program director of a program promoting NERICA rice in Uganda, with support from the Food and Agriculture Organization.

He then spent several years, as the National Program Coordinator for two development programs, jointly founded by the European Union and Government of Uganda to uplift living conditions in the Northern Region of Uganda. The Northern Uganda Agricultural Livelihoods Recovery Program (ALREP), worth €20 million and the Karamoja Livelihoods Program (KALIP), worth €15 million, ran between 2010 and 2016.

Iyamulemye was first appointed as CEO of UCDA in 2016. In 2021, the UCDA Board renewed his contract for another five years, based on the positive outcome of his first term.

See also
 Ministry of Agriculture, Animal Industry and Fisheries (Uganda)

References

External links
 Website of Uganda Coffee Development Authority
 Personal Profile at LinkedIn

Living people
1970s births
Ugandan scientists
Ugandan businesspeople
Ugandan business executives
Ugandan chief executives
Uganda Martyrs University alumni
Wageningen University and Research alumni
People from Eastern Region, Uganda